Group B was one of four groups of national teams competing at the 2010 Africa Cup of Nations. The group's first round of matches began on January 11 and its last matches were played on January 19. Most matches were played at the Estádio Chimandela in Cabinda and featured Ivory Coast, joined by Ghana and Burkina Faso. Togo pulled out before the opening game because of the attack on their team bus.

Standings

Ivory Coast vs Burkina Faso

Ivory Coast vs Ghana

Burkina Faso vs Ghana

References 

Group
2010 in Ivorian football
Group
2010 in Burkinabé sport